Mount Braddock is an unincorporated community in Fayette County, Pennsylvania, United States. Mount Braddock has a post office, with ZIP code 15465, which opened on June 12, 1873.

References

Unincorporated communities in Fayette County, Pennsylvania
Unincorporated communities in Pennsylvania